Little Cay is an island of the British Virgin Islands in the Caribbean. 

Islands of the British Virgin Islands